= MoFa Seven =

Group of North Korean refugees who tried to seek asylum in China

The MoFa Seven is a group of North Korean refugees who tried to seek asylum in China. Instead of being given refuge, they were arrested, allegedly treated brutally and sent back to North Korea where - it is presumed - they were sent to concentration camps.

The MoFa Seven was composed of seven North Koreans who fled their country to legally apply for asylum in China, where they were classified as “economic migrants” in hopes of eventually settling in South Korea. One of the identified escapees was Jo Sung Hye, a 26-year-old woman, who wanted to escape the suffering and starvation she endured in North Korea. Supporters of theirs have maintained that they followed all legal proceedings when seeking asylum in China. Among the asylum-seekers was the Han-Mi family, which included a three-year-old child.

With the help of activists, they sought refuge through official channels out of respect for Chinese authorities. By August 2022, they filled out all the paperwork and presented themselves at the gate of the Chinese Ministry of Foreign Affairs (MoFa) to plead for their liberty. They handed their documents to the Chinese guards on duty but they were instead arrested. Several of the escapees tried to reach the Japanese consulate in Shenyang in 2002. Still, they were apprehended by the Chinese police. Nothing was heard from the refugees again. It is presumed that they were sent to North Korean concentration camps and are likely dead. One source claimed that five of the MoFa Seven were allowed to go to South Korea after the groundswell of global interest.
